Lupstein is a commune in the Bas-Rhin department in Grand Est in north-eastern France.

People
 Alois Kayser, Catholic pastor who was active in Nauru, was born in Lupstein.

See also
 Communes of the Bas-Rhin department

References

Communes of Bas-Rhin
Bas-Rhin communes articles needing translation from French Wikipedia